Rasstriga is an extinct genus of insects. It existed in what is now Illinois, U.S.A. during the Pennsylvanian subperiod. It was described by D. S. Aristov and A. P. Rasnitsyn in 2012, and the type species is R. americana. Its body measured 22.5 millimetres in length, while its forewings were about 23 millimetres. It is currently placed in the family Idelinellidae, although its placement is uncertain.

References

External links
 Rasstriga at the Paleobiology Database

Pennsylvanian insects
Pennsylvanian animals of North America
Paleozoic insects of North America
Carboniferous United States
Fossil taxa described in 2012
Extinct animals of the United States
Pennsylvanian first appearances
Pennsylvanian extinctions